Harlan Briggs (August 17, 1879 – January 26, 1952) was an American actor and Vaudeville performer who was active from the 1930s until his death in 1952. During the course of his career he appeared on Broadway, in over 100 films, as well as appearing on television once towards the end of his career.

Early life
Briggs was born on August 17, 1879, in Blissfield, Michigan. Although he was a graduate of the University of Michigan Law School, he chose to go into acting rather than pursue a career in law.

Career
His acting career began in Vaudeville at around the beginning of the 20th century. He would make his Broadway debut in 1926, in the drama Up the Line. He worked steadily on Broadway through 1935. On August 6, 1929, he began a successful run in the featured role of G. A. Appleby in It's a Wise Child at the Belasco Theatre. In 1934 he had another featured role in the successful play, Dodsworth, as Tubby Pearson. The show opened at the Shubert Theatre on February 24, 1934, and ran for 147 performances, starring Walter Huston as Samuel Dodsworth. After a six-week hiatus, the show reopened at the Shubert on August 20 and ran for an additional 168 performances. When Samuel Goldwyn brought the rights to the play, Briggs was one of two of the original Broadway cast to reprise their roles in the film, the other being Huston in the title role. He would focus on his film career for the remainder of the 1930s, before returning to Broadway in the 1940s, combining both stage and screen performances during that decade. The most successful of his Broadway appearances in the 1940s was as Constable Small in Ramshackle Inn, which featured ZaSu Pitts in her Broadway debut.

The Story of Mary Surratt, in which Briggs appeared in 1947, was Briggs' 400th play.

Beginning with Dodsworth, Briggs worked consistently in films over the next 16 years, until his death in 1952, appearing in over 100 films. His most famous role was as Dr. Stall in the 1940 comedy classic, The Bank Dick, starring W.C. Fields. Other notable films in which he appeared include: After the Thin Man (1936); Stella Dallas (1937); Having Wonderful Time (1938); The Adventures of Huckleberry Finn (1939); Mr. Smith Goes to Washington (1939); My Little Chickadee (1940); Abe Lincoln in Illinois (1940); State Fair (1945); Night and Day (1946); Little Women (1949); Goodbye, My Fancy (1951) and Carrie (1952). The last film on which Briggs worked was The Sea Hornet, which was in production in April and May 1951, and released later that year.

Personal life
Briggs married actress Viola Scott on July 3, 1914. They had four sons.

Death
On January 26, 1952, Briggs died in Motion Picture & Television Country House and Hospital from complications resulting from a heart attack. He was buried in Glen Haven Memorial Park in Los Angeles County, California. His death occurred almost half a year prior to the release of Carrie.

Filmography

(Per AFI database)

We're in the Money  (1935) as Justice of the Peace (uncredited)
Mad Holiday  (1936) as Mr. Kinney
After the Thin Man  (1936) as Burton Forrest (uncredited)
Dodsworth  (1936) as Tubby Pearson
The Garden of Allah  (1936) as American Tourist in Hotel (uncredited)
Happy Go Lucky  (1936) as U.S. Consul E.R. Brown
Dynamite Delaney  (1936)
Marked Woman  (1937) as Sad Man with Emmy Lou in Nightclub (uncredited)
Riding on Air  (1937) as Mr. Harrison
Stella Dallas  (1937) as Mr. Beamer (uncredited)
Exclusive  (1937) as Springer
Quick Money  (1937) as Thorndyke Barnsdale
A Family Affair  (1937) as Oscar Stubbins
Easy Living  (1937) as Office Manager
Maytime  (1937) as Bearded Director (uncredited)
Beg Borrow or Steal  (1937) as Mr. Virgil Miller
That's My Story  (1937) as Sheriff Allen
Married Before Breakfast  (1937) as Mr. Silas Moriarity (uncredited)
Live, Love and Learn  (1937) as Justice of The Peace
Trouble at Midnight  (1937) as Sheriff
Behind the Mike (1937) as Sheriff
Having Wonderful Time  (1938) as Mr. Shaw
Sing You Sinners  (1938) as Customer at Gas Station (uncredited)
A Yank at Oxford  (1938) as Printer (uncredited)
You and Me  (1938) as Thomas McTavish (uncredited)
A Man to Remember  (1938) as Homer Ramsey
Reckless Living  (1938) as 'Colonel' Harris
Meet the Girls  (1938) as Ship's Captain
One Wild Night  (1938) as Mayor
 The Missing Guest (1938) as Frank Kendall - Editor
The Adventures of Huckleberry Finn  (1939) as Mr. Rucker (uncredited)
Made for Each Other  (1939) as Judge (uncredited)
5th Avenue Girl  (1939) as Stanton - Union Representative (uncredited)
Blondie Takes a Vacation  (1939) as Mr. Holden
Flight at Midnight  (1939) as 'Pop' Hussey
Bad Little Angel  (1939) as Lem Dodd - Man in Jim's Office (uncredited)
Mr. Smith Goes to Washington  (1939) as Mr. Edwards - Howling Citizen (uncredited)
The Mysterious Miss X  (1939) as Charlie Graham
Almost a Gentleman  (1939) as Doc Rollins
Boy Trouble  (1939) as Mr. Pike
Tell No Tales  (1939) as Davie Bryant
Cafe Society  (1939) as Justice of the Peace (uncredited)
Maisie  (1939) as Deputy Sheriff Cal Hoskins
The Man They Could Not Hang  (1939) as Defense Attorney Parker (uncredited)
Calling Dr. Kildare  (1939) as James Galt
Frontier Marshal  (1939) as Editor (uncredited)
Charlie Chan's Murder Cruise  (1940) as Coroner
Jennie  (1940) as Mr. Veitch
My Little Chickadee  (1940) as Hotel Clerk (uncredited)
The Bank Dick  (1940) as Dr. Stall
Abe Lincoln in Illinois  (1940) as Denton Offut
I Love You Again  (1940) as Mayor Carver (uncredited)
Lucky Partners  (1940) as Mayor (uncredited)
Brother Orchid  (1940) as Thomas A. Bailey - Acme Paving (uncredited)
Youth Will Be Served  (1940) as Postmaster (uncredited)
Edison, the Man  (1940) as Bisbee (uncredited)
Alias the Deacon  (1940) as Sheriff Ollie (uncredited)
Brother Rat and a Baby  (1940)
Slightly Tempted  (1940) as Chief of Police Wilson (uncredited)
The Man Who Wouldn't Talk  (1940) as Foreman in Jury
Young As You Feel  (1940) as Dr. Kinsley
Among the Living  (1941) as Judge
One Foot in Heaven  (1941) as Mac MacFarland (uncredited)
Paris Calling  (1941) as Papa Picon (uncredited)
Tennessee Johnson  (1942) as Senator (uncredited)
The Vanishing Virginian  (1942) as Mr. Rogard
The Remarkable Andrew  (1942) as Sheriff Clem Watkins
There's One Born Every Minute  (1942) as Luke Simpson (uncredited)
Lady Bodyguard  (1943) as Gaston
Conflict  (1945) as Pawnbroker #2 (uncredited)
State Fair  (1945) as Food Judge (uncredited)
The Strange Affair of Uncle Harry  (1945)
Canyon Passage  (1946) as Dr. Balance (uncredited)
Do You Love Me  (1946) as Mr. Higbee (uncredited)
It's Great to Be Young  (1946)
Magnificent Doll  (1946) as Quinn (uncredited)
My Pal Trigger  (1946) as Dr. Bentley
Mysterious Intruder  (1946) as Mr. Brown
Night and Day  (1946) as Stage Doorman (uncredited)
Personality Kid  (1946) as Mr. Howard
Rendezvous with Annie  (1946) as Doorman (uncredited)
A Stolen Life  (1946) as Fisherman (uncredited)
To Each His Own  (1946) as Dr. McLaughlin (uncredited)
Cynthia  (1947) as J.M. Dingle
Ladies' Man  (1947) as Mr. Ryan (uncredited)
The Perils of Pauline  (1947) as Jake (uncredited)
The Son of Rusty  (1947) as Dr. McNamara (uncredited)
Spoilers of the North  (1947) as Salty
Vigilantes of Boomtown  (1947) as Seth—Judge (uncredited)
A Double Life  (1948) as Oscar Bernard
Fury at Furnace Creek  (1948) as Prosecutor (uncredited)
Little Women  (1949) as Old Crony at Grace's store (uncredited)
Rusty Saves a Life  (1949) as Dr. McNamara (uncredited)
Return of the Frontiersman  (1950) as Zack (uncredited)
Goodbye, My Fancy  (1951) as Janitor (scenes deleted)
The Sea Hornet  (1951) as Watchman (uncredited)
Carrie  (1952) as Joe Brant

References

External links

 
 
 

1879 births
1952 deaths
Vaudeville performers
20th-century American male actors
American male film actors
Male actors from Michigan
University of Michigan Law School alumni
People from Blissfield, Michigan